Micah Makanamaikalani Christenson (born May 8, 1993) is an American professional volleyball player. He is part of the US national team, and is a bronze medalist at the Olympic Games Rio 2016 and the 2018 World Championship, the 2014 World League and the 2015 World Cup winner. At the professional club level, he plays for Zenit Kazan.

Personal life
Christenson was born in Honolulu, Hawaii to Robert and Charlene Christenson. His parents both attended the University of Hawaii at Hilo, where his father, Robert, played basketball and his mother, Charlene, won three volleyball national championships and was named a two-time All-American. His sister, Joanna, played volleyball at Southern Utah University. Christenson began playing club volleyball in 2005 with Asics Quicksilver; he also played basketball and was two time Gatorade Player of the year in Hawai'i.

Christenson is married to Brooke Christenson. They have two sons together. Christenson is a Christian.

Career
Christenson was a basketball and volleyball player for Kamehameha Schools Kapālama in Honolulu, graduating in 2011. He led his teams to three state championship titles (basketball in 2009 and 2011, and volleyball in 2011) and played in six state championship games. He attended the University of Southern California and played for the USC Trojans men's volleyball team. He was a starter on the U.S. Junior National Team that won a gold medal in the 2010 NORCECA Junior Championship in Canada and also played the FIVB 2009 Boy's Youth World Championship in Italy. In 2011 he played for the U.S. Junior National Team during the 2011 FIVB Men’s Junior World Championship in Brazil where the team placed fourth. He captained the U.S. Junior National Team to win a gold medal at the 2012 NORCECA Men's Junior Continental Championship in Colorado Springs.

He was supposed to play on the 2013 U.S. Men’s Junior National Team but got called up to the senior team instead. He debuted with the U.S. national team at the NORCECA Championship, which USA won; Christenson was named Best Server and Best Setter in this tournament. He also competed in the 2013 FIVB World Grand Champions Cup. In 2014 he won the gold medal at the World League, held in Florence, Italy. He began senior-level competition at age 20. He is the youngest starting setter to ever compete for the U.S. on a national team for both junior level and senior level.

At club level, he played on the team that won 2016-2017 Superlega, Italy's top championship, with Cucine Lube Civitanova.

As of 2021,  he signed a two-year contract to play in the Russian club, Zenit Kazan. Suffering only one loss in the entirety of the 2020 Russian SuperLeague in their first match against Dynamo Moscow , Kazan was able to win the first season of the Superleague.

Honours

Clubs
 CEV Champions League
  2017/2018 – with Cucine Lube Civitanova

 FIVB Club World Championship
  Poland 2017 – with Cucine Lube Civitanova

 National championships
 2016/2017  Italian Cup, with Cucine Lube Civitanova
 2016/2017  Italian Championship, with Cucine Lube Civitanova
 2018/2019  Italian Supercup, with Modena Volley
 2021/2022  Russian Cup, with Zenit Kazan

Individual awards
 2013: NORCECA Championship – Best Setter
 2013: NORCECA Championship – Best Server
 2015: FIVB World Cup – Best Setter
 2017: NORCECA Championship – Most Valuable Player
 2018: FIVB World Championship – Best Setter
 2019: FIVB Nations League – Best Setter
 2019: FIVB World Cup – Best Setter
 2022: FIVB Nations League – Best Setter

References

External links

 Player profile at TeamUSA.org 
 
 Player profile at LegaVolley.it 
 
 
 Player profile at Volleybox.net

1993 births
Living people
Volleyball players from Honolulu
Kamehameha Schools alumni
American men's volleyball players
Olympic volleyball players of the United States
Volleyball players at the 2016 Summer Olympics
Volleyball players at the 2020 Summer Olympics
Medalists at the 2016 Summer Olympics
Olympic bronze medalists for the United States in volleyball
American expatriate sportspeople in Italy
Expatriate volleyball players in Italy
American expatriate sportspeople in Russia
Expatriate volleyball players in Russia
USC Trojans men's volleyball players
Volley Lube players
Modena Volley players
VC Zenit Kazan players
Setters (volleyball)